Shanti Stupa is a Buddhist white-domed Stupa (chorten) on a hilltop in Chanspa, Leh district, Ladakh, in north India. It was built in 1991 by Japanese Buddhist Bhikshu, Gyomyo Nakamura. The Shanti Stupa holds the relics of the Buddha at its base, enshrined by the 14th Dalai Lama. The Stupa has become a tourist attraction not only due to its religious significance but also due to its location which provides panoramic views of the surrounding landscape.

Construction
The Shanti Stupa was built by both Japanese Buddhists and Ladakh Buddhists. Original idea was started by The Great King Ashoka and Nichidatsu Fujii  emplement His idea to modern time as a symbol of peace. The mission of Nichidatsu Fujii was to build Shanti Stupa as a symbol of peace.

Construction of the Shanti Stupa began in April 1983 under the supervision of Bhikshu Gyomyo Nakamura. And  Kushok Bakula, a Head Lama of Ladakh helped his activities from New Delhi because he was member of the Minority Commission of Govt of India. The project was built with the help of Ladakhi Buddhists, who offered voluntary labour, and financially supported by Japanese Buddhists as well as Indian suppoters.The then Prime Minister of India, Indira Gandhi, sanctioned the construction of a vehicular road to the stupa in 1984. The Indian Army continued support during the construction period. The State Government of J&K provided construction materials for this project. The 14th Dalai Lama, Tenzin Gyatso inaugurated foundation of Stupa in August 1985.

Description and significance

The Shanti Stupa features the photograph of the Dalai Lama with the relics of the Buddha at its base. The Stupa is built as a two-level structure. The first level features the central relief of Dharmachakra with deer on each side. A central golden Buddha image sits on a platform depicting the "turning wheel of Dharma" (Dharmachakra). The second level has reliefs depicting the "birth" of Buddha, the death of Buddha (mahanirvana) and Buddha "defeating the devils" while meditating. Both levels feature a series of smaller meditating Buddha reliefs.

The Shanti Stupa was built to promote world peace and prosperity and to commemorate 2500 years of Buddhism. It is considered a symbol of the ties between the people of Japan and India.

Tourist attraction
Since its inauguration, Shanti Stupa has become a popular tourist attraction. According to The Hindu it is the "most famous tourist attraction" around Leh, though its architectural style is different from the Ladakhi style. The Shanti Stupa overlooks the city of Leh, providing panoramic views of the city, the village of Changspa, Namgyal Tsemo in the distance and the surrounding mountains. Sunrise and sunset are considered to provide the best views from Shanti Stupa. The Stupa is illuminated with lights at night. The Stupa is open for tourists between 8:00 a.m. and 8:00 p.m.

Access

The Stupa can be reached by a drivable road or on foot using a series of 555 steep steps to the hilltop.

See also
Peace Pagoda
Bhikshu Gyomyo Nakamura

Notes

External links 

Buildings and structures completed in 1991
Stupas in India
Tourism in Ladakh
Leh
1991 establishments in Jammu and Kashmir
Buildings and structures in Ladakh
20th-century architecture in India